Armapore PG College is a government aided college and is affiliated to CSJM University, Kanpur, Uttar Pradesh, in India.

Location

It is located on Lucknow-Jhansi Road about 2 kilometer towards west from Vijay Nagar crossing.

Faculties

Arts
Commerce
Physical Education

Courses

Government-aided
B.A. (Hindi, English, Sanskrit, Economics, Sociology, Drawing & Painting, Education)
M.A. (Hindi, English, Sanskrit, Economics, Sociology)
B.Com.
Self-financed
M.Com.
Physical Education

References

Universities and colleges in Kanpur
Colleges affiliated to Chhatrapati Shahu Ji Maharaj University
Educational institutions established in 1978
1978 establishments in Uttar Pradesh
Postgraduate colleges in Uttar Pradesh